Baryancistrus beggini, commonly known as the blue panaque, is a species of catfish in the family Loricariidae. It is a freshwater fish native to South America, where it is known from Venezuela and Colombia. The species is found in areas with boulders or interstices of granitic bedrock in exposed portions of the Guiana Shield. It is reported to feed on periphyton and microfauna that occur on the surfaces and undersides of rocks in its habitat. The species reaches 8.1 cm (3.2 inches) SL. Its specific epithet honors Chris Beggin, who supported the research of the species. In the aquarium trade, this species is sometimes known by its L-number, which is L-239.

References 

Fish described in 2009
Freshwater fish of South America
Ancistrini